The following is a list of senators from Bouches-du-Rhône, France.

French Third Republic (1870–1940)
 Alphonse–Henri Esquiros (January 1876–May 1876).
 Eugène Pelletan (1876–1884).
 Paul Challemel–Lacour (1876–1896).
 Henry Barne (1879–1893).
 Geoffroy Velten (1885–1912).
 Frédéric Monier (1894–1903).
 Paul Peytral (1894–1919).
 Victor Leydet (1897–1908).
 Jean–Marie Bayol (1903–1905).
 Siméon Flaissières (1906–1930).
 Antide Boyer (1909–1912).
 Camille Pelletan (1912–1915).
 Frédéric Mascle (1912–1917).
 Louis Artaud (1920–1921).
 Louis Pasquet (1920–1931).
 Abraham Schrameck (1920–1945).
 Benoît Bergeon (1921–1939).
 Théophile Pujès (1930–1939).
 Léon Bon (1939–1945).
 Vincent Delpuech (1939–1945).
 Henri Tasso (1939–1945).

French Fourth Republic (1946–1958)
 Charles Coste (1946–1948).
 Anne–Marie Trinquier (1946–1948).
 Roger Carcassonne (1946–1959).
 Léon David (1946–1959).
 Mireille Dumont (1946–1955).
 Joseph Lasalarié (1948–1955).
 Émilien Lieutaud (1948–1955).
 Vincent Delpuech (1955–1959).
 Robert Marignan (1955–1959).
 Irma Rapuzzi (1955–1959).

French Fifth Republic (1958–ongoing)

 Roger Carcassonne (1959-1971).
 Léon David (1959-1978).
 Gaston Defferre (1959-1962).
 Vincent Delpuech (1959-1966).
 Irma Rapuzzi (1959-1989).
 Roger Delagnes (1962-1974).
 Jacques Rastoin (1966-1971).
 Félix Ciccolini (1971-1989).	
 Jean Francou (1971-1989).
 Antoine Andrieux (1974-1983).
 Louis Minetti (1978-1998).
 Charles Bonifay (1980-1989)			
 Pierre Matraja (1980-1989).
 Bastien Leccia (1983-1989).
 Jean-Pierre Camoin (1989-1998).
 Louis Philibert (1989-1998).
 André Vallet (1989-2008).
 Robert Vigouroux (1989 à 1998).
 Jean-Claude Gaudin (1989-1995; 1998-ongoing).
 Jean-Pierre Lafond (1995-1998).
 Henri d'Attilio (1998-2004).
 Robert Bret (1998-2008).
 Francis Giraud (1998-2008).
 Jean-François Picheral (1998-2008).
 Jean-Noël Guérini (1998-present).
 Jacques Siffre (2004-2008).
 Serge Andreoni (2008-2014).
 Samia Ghali (2008-present).
 Bruno Gilles (2008-present).
 Sophie Joissains (2008-present).
 Isabelle Pasquet (2008-2014).
 Roland Povinelli (2008-2014).
 Michel Amiel (2014-present).
 Mireille Jouve (2014-present).
 Stéphane Ravier (2014-present).

References

Sources

 
Bouches-du-Rhône